Baya is a village in Sar-e Pol Province, Afghanistan.

See also
 Sar-e Pol Province

References

Populated places in Sar-e Pol Province